Several ships of the Swedish Navy have been named HSwMS Magne, named after Magni, the son of Thor in Norse mythology:

  was a destroyer launched in 1905 and decommissioned in 1936
  was a  launched in 1942 and decommissioned in 1966
  was a  launched in 1978 and decommissioned in 1995

Swedish Navy ship names